In the European Regional Rugby World Cup Qualifying, two teams, Georgia and Russia, qualified directly to the World Cup, and Romania, the third place team, entered a playoff against the second place African team, Tunisia.

The Qualification process primarily based around the 2008–2010 European Nations Cup. The top two teams in the 2008-2010 European Nations Cup First Division qualified directly to New Zealand.

The third placed team entered a playoff series against the champions of Division 2A, and the leaders of the remaining divisions (excluding 3D) as of the end of the 2008–2009 season. The winner of this playoff, Romania, entered a playoff to decide the 20th place at Rugby World Cup 2011.

Round 1: European Nations Cup 2008–2010

Division 1
Georgia, the winner of Division 1 qualified for Pool B of Rugby World Cup 2011 as Europe 1, and Russia the runner-up, for Pool C as Europe 2.  Romania, the third placed team, entered at Round 5 of Round 2's Playoff Series. Numbers in parentheses indicate world ranking at the start of the tournament.

Division 2A
The winner of the division, Ukraine, qualified for Round 4 of Round 2's Playoff.

1 The match between Poland and Moldova was originally scheduled for April 10, 2010, but was postponed after the death of Poland's president, Lech Kaczyński, earlier that day. The match was moved to January 1, 2011.

Division 2B
The leader of the division at the end of the 2008–2009 season, Netherlands, qualified for Round 3 of Round 2's Playoff.

Division 3A
The leader of the division at the end of the 2008–2009 season, Lithuania, qualified for Round 2 of Round 2's Playoff.

Armenia were ranked ahead of Serbia and Andorra were ranked ahead of Switzerland based on head-to-head results.

All four remaining matches were scratched as Lithuania had already won the group.

Division 3B
The leader of the division at the end of the 2008–2009 season, Slovenia, qualified for Round 1 of Round 2's Playoff.

Division 3C
The leader of the division at the end of the 2008–2009 season, Israel, qualified for Round 1 of Round 2's Playoff.

Round 2: European Nations Cup Champions Playoff Series

Sources
http://www.irb.com
https://web.archive.org/web/20110825205045/http://www.fira-aer-rugby.com/
http://www.fira-aer-rugby.com/medias/matches/2008_BG_IL.pdf
https://web.archive.org/web/20090521154538/http://fpr.pt/noticias/noticia.asp?opm=25&id=7542&id2=25

2011
European
2007–08 in European rugby union
2008–09 in European rugby union
2009–10 in European rugby union